Bianka Schermann (born 26 June 2003) is a Hungarian artistic gymnast and a member of the Hungary women's national gymnastics team. She competed at the 2019 World Championships and the 2019 European Games, and took the silver medal on vault at the 2021 Cairo World Challenge Cup.

Personal life
Schermann was born on 26 June 2003 in Budapest. She is the older sister of figure skater Regina Schermann. Bianka speaks English and Mandarin in addition to Hungarian.

Career

Junior
In June 2017, Schermann placed fourth in the all-around at the Gym Festival Trnava in Slovakia, where she also took the bronze medal in the junior uneven bars final. In July, Schermann was selected to the Hungarian team for the 2017 European Youth Olympic Festival alongside Csenge Bácskay and Nóra Fehér. The team finished fourth behind Russia, Italy and Germany. Individually, Schermann placed ninth in the all-around and seventh on floor exercise. Later that year, Schermann competed at the Olympic Hopes Cup, placing ninth in the all-around and sixth on vault. At the Hungarian Master Championships, Schermann won the all-around, also taking the gold on vault and floor, silver on beam and bronze on the uneven bars.

In May 2018, Schermann competed at the 2018 Gymnasiade in Morocco, where the Hungarian team of Schermann, Nóra Fehér, Csenge Bácskay, Sára Péter and Zója Székely won the gold medal. Schermann also tied for the bronze medal on the floor exercise. Schermann represented Hungary at the 2018 European Championships, where she finished sixteenth in the junior all-around competition.

Senior
Schermann made her international senior debut at the 2019 DTB Team Challenge in Germany, where she finished thirteenth in the all-around and seventh with the Hungarian team. In June 2019, Schermann was selected to compete at the 2019 European Games in Minsk. She qualified to the all-around final where she placed ninth. In September, Schermann competed at the Szombathely World Challenge Cup, finishing sixth in both the uneven bars and floor exercise finals. Schermann was selected to the Hungarian team for the 2019 World Championships alongside Dorina Böczögő, Zsófia Kovács, Noémi Makra and Sára Péter. The team finished eighteenth in qualifications. Individuallly, Schermann placed 44th in the all-around and did not advance to the finals.

Schermann missed the 2020 European Championships due to injury.

In May 2021, Schermann competed at the Varna World Challenge Cup in Bulgaria, where she finished sixth in the vault final. In June, she competed at the Cairo World Challenge Cup in Egypt, where she took the silver medal in the vault final behind Nancy Taman. She also qualified to the floor exercise final, where she placed eighth. At the Flanders International Team Challenge (FIT Challenge), Schermann contributed to the Hungarian team’s ninth place finish.

Competitive history

References

External links
 

2003 births
Living people
Hungarian female artistic gymnasts
Gymnasts from Budapest
Gymnasts at the 2019 European Games
European Games competitors for Hungary
21st-century Hungarian women